José Eloy Jiménez Moreno (born 14 June 1971) is a Spanish retired footballer who played as a forward and is a current manager.

His name was most associated with Las Palmas, with whom he played two La Liga seasons at the start of the 2000s. He achieved Segunda División totals of 158 games and 48 goals for that club and Córdoba, as well as 213 appearances and 71 goals across six teams in Segunda División B.

Playing career
Born in Hellín, Albacete, Castile-La Mancha, Jiménez made his senior debuts with hometown's Bakú Hellín Deportivo in 1991, in the regional leagues. After appearing in Segunda División B with Yeclano CF, CE L'Hospitalet, Levante UD and UD Las Palmas (also scoring a career-best 24 goals with the latter), he joined Elche CF in the same division in the 1996 summer, scoring 19 goals as his side were promoted.

On 31 August 1997, aged 26, Jiménez made his professional debut, starting in a 1–2 away loss against CD Numancia. He scored his first goals on 20 September, netting four goals in a 5–0 home routing over CD Logroñés.

Jiménez scored 20 goals in the campaign, and subsequently moved back to Las Palmas, now in the second level. He appeared regularly with the side, winning promotion in 1999–2000 whilst contributing with 13 goals.

Jiménez made his La Liga debut on 10 September 2000, starting in a 0–3 home loss against Deportivo Alavés. He scored his first goal in the competition on the 23rd, netting his side's only in a 1–1 home draw against Real Valladolid.

Jiménez left Las Palmas in January 2002, after appearing rarely in the 2001–02 season, and moved to Córdoba CF in the second division. After featuring regularly he signed for third level's CD Castellón in the 2003 summer.

Jiménez retired in June 2006, aged 35, with his first club Hellín, acting as a player-manager.

Manager career
Immediately after retiring, Jiménez was appointed Hellín's full-time manager, and remained in charge until 2009. In July 2009 he was appointed UB Conquense manager.

Jiménez was relieved from his duties on 5 January 2011. On 1 December of the following year he was appointed at the helm of La Roda CF, and after leading the club to a comfortable 10th place, he resigned.

On 27 June 2014 Jiménez was named UCAM Murcia CF manager. After missing out promotion in the play-offs, he left the club.

On 7 October 2016, Jiménez was appointed as new head coach of Mérida AD. He announced his departure the following 19 May, after leading the club to a fifth place in their group.

On 8 April 2018, Jiménez replaced fired Antonio Calderón at the helm of CF Fuenlabrada also in the third division, staying in charge until the end of the season and missing out promotion in the play-offs.

On 21 April 2019, Jiménez was named manager of second division side CD Lugo, in the place of fired Alberto Monteagudo. He was himself dismissed on 26 December, with the club nearing the relegation places during the season.

Personal life
Jiménez's son, also named Eloy (born 1995), became a midfielder. He never played any higher than the third tier.

Managerial statistics

References

External links

1971 births
Living people
People from Hellín
Sportspeople from the Province of Albacete
Spanish footballers
Footballers from Castilla–La Mancha
Association football forwards
La Liga players
Segunda División players
Tercera División players
Yeclano CF players
CE L'Hospitalet players
Levante UD footballers
UD Las Palmas players
Elche CF players
Córdoba CF players
CD Castellón footballers
Spanish football managers
Segunda División managers
Primera Federación managers
Segunda División B managers
Tercera División managers
UB Conquense managers
La Roda CF managers
UCAM Murcia CF managers
CF Fuenlabrada managers
CD Lugo managers
CD Atlético Baleares managers